Belle Fontaine is an unincorporated community and census-designated place (CDP) in Mobile County, Alabama, United States, on the western shore of Mobile Bay. It is located south of the city of Mobile, along the stretch of shore between the Deer River and the Fowl River. As of the 2020 census, its population was 613.

The Belle Fontaine shoreline experiences the occasional jubilee, a rare phenomenon in which fish and crustaceans swarm in the water, just off the beach.

Demographics

References

External links 
 Location on Google Maps

Census-designated places in Alabama
Unincorporated communities in Alabama
Census-designated places in Mobile County, Alabama
Unincorporated communities in Mobile County, Alabama
Populated coastal places in Alabama